Earth (released in India as 1947: Earth) is a 1999 Indo-Canadian period romance drama film directed by Deepa Mehta. It is based upon Bapsi Sidhwa's novel, Cracking India (1991, US; 1992, India; originally published as Ice Candy Man, 1988, UK), set during the 1947 partition of India. Earth is the second instalment of Mehta's Elements trilogy, preceded by Fire (1996) and followed by Water (2005). It was India's entry for the 1999 Academy Award for Best Foreign Language Film.

Plot
The story is set in Lahore (now the capital of Pakistani Punjab) in the time period directly before and during the partition of India in 1947 at the time of Indian independence.

A young girl with polio, Lenny (Maia Sethna), narrates the story through the voice of her adult self (Shabana Azmi). She is from a wealthy Parsi family who hope to remain neutral to the rising tensions between Hindus, Sikhs, and Muslims in the area. She is adored and protected by her parents, Bunty (Kitu Gidwani) and Rustom (Arif Zakaria), and cared for by her Ayah, named Shanta (Nandita Das). Both Dil Navaz, the Ice-Candy Man (Aamir Khan), and Hassan, the Masseur (Rahul Khanna) are in love with Shanta. Shanta, Dil, and Hassan are part of a small group of friends from different faiths (some of whom work for Lenny's family) who spend their days together in the park. With partition, however, this once unified group of friends becomes divided and tragedy ensues.

Cast
 Aamir Khan – Dil Nawaz 
 Rahul Khanna – Hassan, the Masseur
 Nandita Das – Shanta, the maid
 Maia Sethna – Lenny Sethna
 Shabana Azmi – older Lenny, narrator
 Kitu Gidwani – Bunty Sethna
 Arif Zakaria – Rustom Sethna
 Kulbhushan Kharbanda – Imam Din
 Kumar Rajendra – Refugee Police
 Pavan Malhotra – Butcher

Critical reception

Reviews
The film holds an 86% rating on Rotten Tomatoes based on 35 reviews. Roger Ebert gave the film three out of four stars and states that Earth "is effective because it doesn't require much history from its viewers, explains what needs to be known, and has a universal message". The New York Times described it as "a powerful and disturbing reminder of how a civilization can suddenly crack under certain pressures". The New Yorker argues that "Deepa Mehta handles her material convincingly, and the cast is so likable that they wear the larger themes like beautiful garments". Rediff.com notes that "Aamir Khan has probably given the best performance of his life. It is hard to imagine another actor bringing alive the nuances of the ice-candy man the way he does". Planet Bollywood gave the film a 9.5 out of 10 and wrote that "Earth is strongly recommended to those who want to see a different type of Hindi film and who are tired of the usual boy meets girl stories and revenge dramas".

Awards and nominations
 Asian Film Festival – Best Film Award
 Filmfare Best Male Debut Award – Rahul Khanna
 Filmfare Best Female Debut Award – Nandita Das
 Earth was India's official entry for the 71st Academy Award for Best Foreign Language Film in 1999, but was not included among the final five nominees selected by the AMPAS.

Soundtrack

See also
 List of Asian historical drama films

References

External links
 
 Official trailer
 

1999 films
1999 romantic drama films
Indian romantic drama films
1990s Hindi-language films
English-language Indian films
Films based on American novels
Films directed by Deepa Mehta
Films set in 1947
Films set in Lahore
Films about religious violence in India
Films set in the partition of India
Films set in the Indian independence movement
Films scored by A. R. Rahman